Wappa meshi (わっぱ飯) is a Japanese dish cooked in special round containers (called wappa, which can be used as Bento boxes) made of thin wooden sheets.  It is rice topped with other ingredients and is a specialty of the Niigata or Fukushima Prefecture.

References

Japanese cuisine